The King Long Jinwei (厦门金龙-金威) is a series of light commercial van produced by the Chinese automobile manufacturer King Long based on licensed tooling of the fourth generation Toyota HiAce. A rebadged variant called the Golden Dragon V4 was sold alongside by Golden Dragon, a subsidiary of King Long. The King Long Jinwei has since been available in a wide range of body configurations, including a minivan/MPV, minibus, panel van, crew van, and an ambulance.

Overview 

Originally launched in 1995, the early models of the King Long Jinwei and Golden Dragon V4 was called the Haise with the code name XML6480, and they were built using the toolings of the Toyota HiAce H100 vans.

Golden Dragon facelift 
A facelift unique to the Golden Dragon brand was revealed after that featured a completely restyled front fascia, black window trims, and tail lamp extensions on to the tailgate for more upmarket trim levels.

On 20 June 2010, a second facelift for the Golden Dragon and King long Jinwei was launched on to market. The updated model features a revised and upgraded interior and an exterior appearance similar to the Foton View models with crystal LED headlights. The updated Jinwei offers both gasoline and diesel powered engines, with five engine options available. For the gasoline engines, options include the 491,V20, and 4RB2 gasoline engines based on Toyota systems, electronic throttle control (ETC) technology, AV1 combustion diagnosis technology and ECU computer smart control for better fuel capability and power output. For diesel engines, options include the GW2.8TC-2 and YC4FB90-30 diesel engines.  
 

A third facelift was launched in June 2014 with CNG versions also available. The 2014 facelift features a slightly redesigned front unique to the King Long brand. A more upmarket model named the King Long Xinjinwei or New Jinwei was launched in December 2016, which is essentially a slightly cheaper King Long Kaige.

References

External links 

http://www.kinglongvan.com.cn - King Long official site. (China)

Jinwei
Minibuses
Cab over vehicles
Vans
Cars introduced in 1995
1990s cars